Renan Barbosa Contar (born 25 December 1983) is a former Brazilian military and politician. Contar was a member of the Legislative Assembly of Mato Grosso do Sul from 2019 to 2023. He ran in the 2022 Mato Grosso do Sul state election as a candidate for governor, but was defeated by Eduardo Riedel (PSDB) on the second round. He attended the Preparatory School of Cadets for the Army in 2002 in Campinas, Brazil. He graduated from the Academia Militar das Agulhas Negras in 2006 in Resende.

He is fluent in English and Spanish.

State deputy 

In 2018, Contar ran in his first election and was the most voted state deputy of Mato Grosso do Sul. In the Legislative Assembly of Mato Grosso do Sul, he guided his actions by defending themes such as: the fight against corruption, tax cuts and a safer state.

Private life 

Son of René Roberto Contar and Miriam Machado Barbosa Contar, both of them advised him to choose the city of Campo Grande to live after training at the Military Academy of Agulhas Negras (AMAN), in order to continue the work related to his family roots. A work started by his paternal grandfather, Mr. Arif Contar, a Lebanese that came to Brazil at the beginning of the last century. Settled in the capital, the family was one of the pioneers in the development of the region. Contar is married to Iara Diniz.

He has always been interested in sports and motorcycling, having traveled 18 countries in America on his motorbike. In one of these adventures, he reaches the borders of America such as Ushuaia (Argentina) and Alaska (United States).

Candidate for the government of Mato Grosso do Sul
Captain Contar was a candidate for the government of Mato Grosso do Sul by the Brazilian Labor Renewal Party, and the lawyer, university professor, businessman and rancher Humberto Sávio Abussafi Figueiró was his running mate.

Contar was polling in the voting intentions in 3rd place, and on October 2, 2022, during the first round of the 2022 Brazilian general election, Contar got 26.71% of the vote, and was the most voted candidate for governor. He qualified for a second round against his opponent, the politician Eduardo Riedel, who got 25.16% of votes. One of the main reasons why his candidacy became so popular was the fact that the former president Jair Bolsonaro, declared his support to Contar's candidacy during a presidential debate on live TV. He was defeated by Riedel on the second round of the election, after only obtaining 43.10% of the votes.

Electoral history

2022 Mato Grosso do Sul gubernatorial election

Legislative Assembly

References

External links

 Profile in the Legislative Assembly of Mato Grosso do Sul
 
 
 
 

Brazilian politicians
1983 births
Living people
Brazilian Labour Renewal Party politicians
People from Campinas